Jimmy Wilburn (November 25, 1908 - August 26, 1984) was an American racecar driver from Los Angeles. He won a non-points Championship Car race at Lakewood Speedway in March 1946 which is the first known Champ Car race to be held after the end of World War II. Later that year he drove in the 1946 Indianapolis 500 driving an Alfa Romeo and started 16th and retired after 52 laps with engine trouble, credited with the 19th finishing position.

Racing career
Earn in his career, Wilburn raced based out of Portland, Oregon in the early 1930s. He next moved to the Oakland, California-based American Racing Association (ARA) before moving back to Los Angeles in the Western Racing Association (WRA). Wilburn next moved to Indianapolis along with Travis "Spider" Webb in 1936 and the duo began competing in Central States Racing Association (CSRA) events in a "big car" (now sprint car). CSRA was one of three major sanctioning bodies in the United States along with the American Automobile Association and the International Motor Contest Association (IMCA). Wilburn won the 1938 CSRA championship and he won his second CSRA championship in 1939. He repeated for his third straight championship in 1940. In 1941, he won several big shows including an IMCA show at Reading, Pennsylvania and twice at Des Moines, Iowa. At the IMCA season finale on October 21 at the Louisiana State Fairgrounds, he was battling Gus Schrader when Schrader died in an accident. Schrader's car pushed up the track and clipped Wilburn's tire causing Schrader's to flip end-over-end.

Racing stopped for World War II. A few events were run in 1945 and Wilburn won in front of a large CSRA crowd of over 124,000 people at Allentown Fairgrounds. Wilburn returned to CSRA in 1946 and won the championship. He won all four IMCA events at the Iowa State Fairgrounds that year. He also competed in his only Indianapolis 500 that year; he finished 19th. In 1947, he won the CSRA championship and finished second to Emory Collins.

In July 1948, Wilburn flipped his Offenhauser at Oskaloosa, Iowa and he was unconscious for several weeks. He returned to racing in 1949; he finished third in the IMCA points behind Frank Luptow and Collins. Wilburn won the 1950 CSRA championship before retiring from racing.

Personal life
Wilburn moved with his wife Mary (the couple married in 1939) to Florida after retiring from racing. He died on August 26, 1984.

Career award
He was inducted in the National Sprint Car Hall of Fame in 1994.

Indianapolis 500 results

References

1908 births
1984 deaths
Indianapolis 500 drivers
National Sprint Car Hall of Fame inductees
Racing drivers from Los Angeles
AAA Championship Car drivers